Noir is a Danish fashion brand founded by designer Peter Ingwersen.

Introduction

Noir and the organic cotton brand, Illuminati II were both founded in 2005. In 2008, they launched the diffusion line Black Noir. The three brands are owned by the holding company Noir Illuminati II Holding.

Presentations and Exhibitions

Noir presents at Copenhagen Fashion Week, which is held every year in February and August. In 2009 and 2010, Noir won Ethical Brand of the Year at the DANSK Fashion Awards. 
Noir has exhibited at Estethica, the eco-sustainable initiative by the British Fashion Council (BFC), at London Fashion Week.

References

Clothing brands
Clothing brands of Denmark
Clothing companies of Denmark
Clothing companies based in Copenhagen
Danish companies established in 2005
Fair trade brands